The Marchant Ward is a Brisbane City Council ward covering Alderley, Aspley, Chermside, Chermside West, Geebung, Gordon Park, Grange, Kedron, Lutwyche, Stafford, Stafford Heights and Windsor.

Councillors for Marchant Ward

Results

References 

City of Brisbane wards